Koil or Koyil or Kovil, (meaning: residence of  God)  is the Tamil term for a distinct style of Hindu temple with Dravidian architecture. Both the terms koyil (kōyil) and kovil (kōvil) are used interchangeably. In Tamil,  (wikt:ta:கோவில்) is the word derived, according to the rules of Tamil grammar.

Description 
In contemporary Tamil, the term 'kōvil' is also used to refer to "Place of Worship". In modern formal speech, kōvil is also referred to as aalayam, dheva sthaanam by many Hindus. Ambalam is another term used by devotees of the 19th century Tamil monk Vallalar. Another term  is 'Thali', which also means temple.

To Shaivites, the foremost kōvils are Chidambaram temple and Koneswaram temple while for Vaishnavites, Sri Ranganathaswamy temple, Srirangam and Tirumala Venkateswara temple, Tirupati are viewed as important. 

The kōvils in Tamil Nadu and the kōvils of Sri Lanka have long histories and have always been associated with the ruler of the time. Most kings patronised temple building in their kingdom, and attached water tanks and villages to the shrine to administer. 

There are over 36,488 Temples in Tamil Nadu alone as registered by Hindu Aranilaya Thurai. The Sangam literature scripted before the common era, refers to some of the temples the early kings of Tamilagam had erected. The songs of the revered Shaiva Nayanars and the Vaishnava Alvar saints that date back to the period 6th to the 9th century CE, provide ample references to the temples of that period. Stone inscriptions found in most temples describe the patronage extended to them by the various rulers.

The most ancient temples were built of wood as well as brick and mortar. Up to about 700 CE temples were mostly of the rock-cut type. The Pallava kings were great builders of temples in stone. The Chola dynasty (850-1279 CE) left a number of monuments to their credit such as the Brihadeeswarar Temple in Thanjavur. The Cholas added many ornate mandpams or halls to temples and constructed large towers. The Pandya style (until 1350 CE) saw the emergence of huge towers, high wall enclosures and enormous towered gateways (Gopurams). The Vijayanagara Style (1350 - 1560 CE) is famous for the intricacy and beauty especially for the decorated monolithic pillars. The Nayak style (1600 - 1750 CE) is noted for the addition of large prakaram (outer courtyard) (circum-ambulatory paths) and pillared halls.

See also
 Dravidian architecture
 Architecture of Tamil Nadu
 Hindu temple#South Indian and Sri Lankan temples

Notes

References

External links

Hindu temple architecture
Tamil Nadu